Karl Bielig (10 October 1898 – 13 June 1991) was a German politician of the Social Democratic Party (SPD) and member of the German Bundestag.

Life 
He was a member of the German Bundestag from the first federal elections in 1949 to 1953. In parliament he represented the constituency of Gandersheim–Salzgitter. He was a member of the committee for all-German issues.

Literature

References

1898 births
1991 deaths
Members of the Bundestag for North Rhine-Westphalia
Members of the Bundestag 1949–1953
Members of the Bundestag for the Social Democratic Party of Germany